Crawfordton House is a category B listed 19th-century country house, situated close to Moniaive in Dumfriesshire, Scotland. It was operated as Crawfordton School in the second half of the 20th century.

History
Crawfordton Tower was a tower house once held by the Crichtons in the 17th century and then the Hays.

Between 1863 and 1866 the present house was built for the Conservative politician Sir George Gustavus Walker (1831–1897), and designed by the Edinburgh-based architects Peddie & Kinnear. Built in local red sandstone, Crawfordton House is an example of Scottish Baronial architecture, with crowstepped gables, towers, turrets and carvings. There is a four-storey square tower over the entrance bay.

In 1940 the house was purchased for use as a school, and in 1941, pupils were evacuated from Belmont House School in East Renfrewshire to Crawfordton House, which had been converted into a preparatory school for this purpose. Extensions were built during the 1970s and 1980s, though these are excluded from the listed building. In 1995, Crawfordton House School closed down. The house was then run as Cademuir International School, which relocated from the Scottish Borders, but which ceased trading in 2006 due to financial difficulties.

Following closure of the school Crawfordton House was placed on the market. It remained unoccupied until 2013 when it was purchased by Hong Kong architect Kenneth Ko, who is currently renovating the house as a family home.

The house was again on the market in 2018, following extensive refurbishment by the current owner.  In December 2021, Crawfordton House is said to be in the hands of 'Master Designer'  Mr Kenneth Ko.

References

External links
Crawfordton School website
Crawfordton Castle, Kenneth Ko website
Crawfordton House, Royal Commission on the Ancient and Historical Monuments of Scotland, including architect's drawings
, Crawfordton House for sale

Houses completed in 1866
Country houses in Dumfries and Galloway
Defunct private schools in Scotland
Defunct preparatory schools in Scotland
Defunct boarding schools in Scotland
Defunct schools in Dumfries and Galloway
Category B listed buildings in Dumfries and Galloway
1866 establishments in Scotland